Rok pierwszy is a 1960 Polish drama film directed by Witold Lesiewicz.

Cast
 Stanisław Zaczyk as sierzant Lukasz Otryna
 Leszek Herdegen as kapral Józef Dunajec
 Aleksandra Śląska as Dorota

References

External links
 

1960 films
1960 drama films
Polish drama films
Polish black-and-white films
1960s Polish-language films
Films directed by Witold Lesiewicz